This article concerns the period 859 BC – 850 BC.

Events and trends
859 BC—Assurnasirpal II dies.
859 BC—Shalmaneser attacks Syria and Israel.
858 BC—Aramu becomes king of Urartu.
858 BC—Shalmaneser III succeeds Assurnasirpal II as king of Assyria.
854 BC or 853 BC—Shalmaneser III battles a Syrian coalition (including king Ahab of Kingdom of Israel and Hadadezer) in the battle of Qarqar.
850 BC—Takelot II succeeds Osorkon II as King of Egypt.
c. 850 BC—Homer composes the Iliad and Odyssey.
c. 850 BC—Mesha erects the Mesha Stele, the Moabite Stone; the story is 34 lines, nearly complete and reveals the name 'Israel', a story of Mesha's revolt against the Kingdom of ancient Israel. 
Nazarites and Rechabites establish early temperance movement.

Births
 Shamshi-Adad V, king of Assyria, is born (approximate date).

Deaths
 Feizi, 1st Ruler of Qin

References 

 

es:Años 850 a. C.